Eutetrapha nephele is an extinct species of beetle in the family Cerambycidae, that existed during the Upper Miocene in what is now Germany. It was described by Heer in 1847.

References

†
Fossil taxa described in 1847
Extinct beetles